Nile Bank Ltd was a private bank registered in Uganda, with shareholders from Uganda, Israel, and South Africa. Nile Bank has an emphasis on consumer banking.

History
Nile Bank was established in 1988 for the purposes of providing banking services to the public at a time when low cost banking was almost non-existent in Uganda. By 1992 the bank had two branches and has since expanded to six branches including branches in Mbarara, Entebbe and Jinja. The bank has around 90,000 customers and in January 2003, Nile Bank became one of the first Ugandan banks to receive ISO certification.

In June 2007 Nile Bank was purchased by Barclays bank. Barclays decided to merge the two client-bases and do an IT systems upgrade at the same time.

Operations
Automated telling
Nile Bank's operations are centered in the capital city of Kampala.  The bank has invested in providing 24-hour banking services to its target mass market. The bank has 21 Automated Teller Machines (ATMs) in and around Kampala and 3 in Mbarara, Entebbe and Jinja bringing the total to twenty four (24) by January 2004.

Credit department
Nile Bank offers CreditSource for consumer loans; FlexiSource for small and medium-sized enterprises (SMEs); WheelSource for automobile loans; and EntertainmentSource for television and satellite dish purchase.

Western Union
Nile Bank is a leading Ugandan agent for Western Union's money transfer service, handling over 200,000 transactions per year.

Dissolution
In June 2007, 100% of Nile Bank Limited was acquired by Barclays Bank from the main shareholder, Israeli businessman Hezi Bezalel, and became part of Barclays Bank (Uganda) Limited.

External links
 Nile Bank Limited

See also

 Barclays Bank (Uganda)
 Banking in Uganda
 Economy of Uganda

References

Banks of Uganda
1988 establishments in Uganda
Banks established in 1988
Banks disestablished in 2007
Barclays